The Sierra Leone Independence Medal was authorised by Queen Elizabeth II on the occasion of the granting of independence to Sierra Leone, to give recognition to individuals of the Royal Sierra Leone Military Forces, Sierra Leone Naval Volunteer Force and the Police Force who were serving on the 27 April 1961. Members of United Kingdom Land Forces seconded to the Royal Sierra Leone Military Forces also qualified.

5,500 medals were supplied by the Royal Mint.

Description
 The reverse depicts the Sierra Leone Coat of Arms surrounded by the inscription Sierra Leone Independence, 27 April 1961 in a half circle above.
 The ribbon has a three vertical stripes, green, white and blue, the colours of the Sierra Leone national flag.

See also 
 Medals of Sierra Leone (1961–1971)

References

Orders, decorations, and medals of Sierra Leone
Military awards and decorations of the United Kingdom
Awards established in 1961